National Alliance Party can refer to one of the following political parties:
National Alliance Party (Papua New Guinea)
National Alliance Party (Chinese-Canadian)